"Club at the End of the Street" is an upbeat pop rock song composed by English musician Elton John with lyrics by Bernie Taupin. It was included on John's album Sleeping with the Past in 1989 and released as its third single in 1990. The song describes a night on the town between two lovers at a disclosed nightclub. John stated in 2013 on Rolling Stone that this song was one of his favourites. He performed this song 3 times live during the One Night Only concerts in 2000.

The music video for the song was animated, due to John's involvement with the family of AIDS victim Ryan White.

B-side
For the single release, John's rendition of the well-known John Lennon song "Give Peace a Chance" was used for the B-side. This song was also released on his 1990 box set, To Be Continued.

Chart performance
The single was a No. 28 pop hit in the US and a Top 40 hit in several countries in the summer of 1990; whilst in Denmark, where the album was recorded, it reached No. 1 for two weeks and remains one of Elton's biggest hits in that country.

Music video
The music video was produced by Animation City, an animation company in London and directed by Derek Hayes; it followed the success of the Madonna video "Dear Jessie" by the same company. The music video version of the track is slightly faster than the single and album versions.

 Director – Derek Hayes
 Producer – Maddy Sparrow
 Designer – Lin Jammet
 Animators – Neville Astley, Paul Cowan, Jimmy Farrington, Kevin Griffiths, Andy Goff, Malcolm Hartley, Derek Hayes and Erica Russell.
 Additional Animation – 'A' For Animation
 Production Company – Animation City

Track listings
7-inch and CD single
 "Club at the End of the Street" – 4:49
 "Give Peace a Chance" – 3:46

12-inch maxi
 "Club at the End of the Street" – 4:49
 "Give Peace a Chance" – 3:46
 "I Don't Wanna Go on with You Like That" (live in Verona, Italy) – 5:37

Personnel
 Elton John – keyboards, lead and harmony vocals, backing vocals 
 Guy Babylon – keyboards
 Fred Mandel – keyboards, organ, guitar
 Peter Iversen – Fairlight and Audiofile programming
 Davey Johnstone – guitar, backing vocals
 Romeo Williams – bass
 Jonathan Moffett – drums
 Vince Denham – saxophone

Charts

Weekly charts

Year-end charts

Release history

See also
 List of European number-one airplay songs of the 1990s

References

1989 songs
1990 singles
Animated music videos
Elton John songs
MCA Records singles
The Rocket Record Company singles
Song recordings produced by Chris Thomas (record producer)
Songs with lyrics by Bernie Taupin
Songs with music by Elton John